Zhang Yan (born 10 May 1992) is a Chinese biathlete. She competed at the Biathlon World Championships 2012 and 2013. She competed at the 2014 Winter Olympics in Sochi, in sprint, pursuit, individual and relay.

References

1992 births
Living people
Biathletes at the 2014 Winter Olympics
Biathletes at the 2018 Winter Olympics 
Chinese female biathletes
Olympic biathletes of China
Asian Games medalists in biathlon
Biathletes at the 2017 Asian Winter Games
Medalists at the 2017 Asian Winter Games
Asian Games silver medalists for China
Sportspeople from Jilin City
Sport shooters from Jilin
Skiers from Jilin
21st-century Chinese women